In the history of Finland, the Kagal was a resistance movement that existed before the 1905 Russian Revolution and founded under the period of Russian oppression, in resistance to the oppressive government of Governor-General Nikolai Bobrikov which actively conducted Russification of Finland. The name (Finnish Kagaali, Swedish Kagal) comes via Russian (hence the -g- for an original -h-) from the Hebrew word qahal, (congregation, assembly). The word was a mocking name used by Russian conservative newspapers as a means of ridicule when referring to the anti-government activity in Finland. In the original meaning, Kagal/Kahal referred to a central body for the Jewish congregations of Russia.

The central character of the Kagal is thought to have been Leo Mechelin, an independent liberal, but notable lead characters also included Carl Mannerheim (older brother of Marshal of Finland Carl Gustaf Emil Mannerheim), Adolf von Bonsdorff, Ernst Estlander, J. N. Reuter, Adolf Törngren and Wilhelm Zilliacus from the Swedish People's Party, and the Young Finns Eero Erkko, Th. Homén, Heikki Renvall and P. E. Svinhufvud.

The Kagal was founded in the Turholma mansion in Laajasalo. The lord of the mansion, General Jacob Julius af Lindfors, had inherited his fortune from his father-in-law Henrik Borgström (1799–1883), who had risen from nothing to owning a house of commerce, and had been present in founding the Liberal Party and acted as a notable patron of the arts.

In a secret meeting, Leo Mechelin wrote a people's address to the Tsar, which gathered 500 000 signatures (the country's population at the time was about 2.6 million). The signatures probably also included Svinhufvud, Erkko and Zilliacus, among others. The Tsar rejected the address and threatened conscientious objectors with loss of study places and offices, but conscription strikes organised by the Kagal had the effect that virtually no one arrived at the army enlistment, and finally the Tsar gave up implementing a mandatory draft.

Later, the Tsar granted Bobrikov full rights as a dictator, and expelled the lead characters of the Kagal from the country (1903). The Kagal continued to act from within Stockholm and other places. Most of the members stood by Mechelin's idea of non-violent resistance, but a minority wing led by writer Konni Zilliacus founded an Active Resistance Party, whose activists murdered oppression leaders, smuggled guns, and despite their centrist politics, made alliances with the Russian socialist revolutionists. Professor Mechelin co-operated with the Russian liberals (Cadet Party).

In 1905, Russia suffered a humiliating military defeat by Japan, which caused social unrest, and finally the Tsar gave up dictatorship in favour of the parliament (Dom). The Finnish Constitutionalists continued their resistance with the support of the socialists, and the Tsar let Mechelin found a government (senate) and bring general and equal voting and election rights and human rights to Finland (1906). This was the end of the first oppression period (1899–1905).

The Women's Kagal was a sister organisation of the Kagal. Among its leaders was the Young Finn academic, Dr. Tekla Hultin, who also supported activist and Jaeger movements. The Women's Kagal distributed forbidden political literature, such as the underground newspaper Vapaita Sanoja (Fria Ord).

Literature

See also 
 Finnish nationalism
 Russification of Finland

Grand Duchy of Finland
Resistance movements
Paramilitary organisations based in Finland